Khovrino is a railway station of Moscow Railway in Moscow. It was opened in November 2020.

Gallery

References

Railway stations in Moscow
Railway stations of Oktyabrskaya Railway
Railway stations in Russia opened in 2020